Harry Moses Simeone (May 9, 1910 – February 22, 2005) was an American music arranger, conductor and composer who popularized the Christmas song "The Little Drummer Boy", for which he received co-writing credit.

Early years
Simeone was born in Newark, New Jersey, United States. He grew up listening to stars performing at the Metropolitan Opera in New York City, not far from his native Newark. Initiated and inspired by this childhood passion, he sought a career as a concert pianist. To this end, he enrolled in the Juilliard School of Music, which he attended for three years, but when he was offered work at CBS as an arranger for bandleader Fred Waring, he dropped out of Juilliard to accept it.

Initial prominence
After garnering vocal and music arrangement credits for the 1938 RKO motion picture Radio City Revels, Simeone relocated to Hollywood with his wife, Margaret McCravy Simeone, who briefly sang with Benny Goodman's orchestra, using the stage name Margaret McCrae, and later with Fred Waring. Once there, he had various music production jobs for several Paramount films between 1939 and 1946, including some that starred Bing Crosby. In 1948, Simeone joined NBC's The Swift Show as the program's orchestra leader, and in 1952, he joined NBC's The Firestone Hour as conductor and choral arranger.

"The Little Drummer Boy"
When the Twentieth-Century Fox Records label contracted Simeone to make a Christmas album in 1958, he assembled a group he called "The Harry Simeone Chorale" and searched for recording material. After being introduced to an obscure song by producer and credited song co-author Henry Onorati, titled "Carol of the Drum" (originally composed by Katherine Kennicott Davis in 1941 and arranged to present form by Jack Halloran), Simeone changed the title to "The Little Drummer Boy" and recorded it under that title for his album Sing We Now of Christmas. He received joint authorship-and-composition credit for the album, although he did not actually write or compose the song. The single "The Little Drummer Boy" quickly became extremely popular and scored on the U.S. music charts from 1958 to 1962. The Simeone Chorale had another Christmas success during 1962, with their rendition of the then-new song "Do You Hear What I Hear?" for Mercury Records.

In 1960, Simeone joined a revived half-hour version of The Kate Smith Show on CBS television, produced by Smith's long-time manager, Ted Collins. Though the program had good reviews, audience levels lagged at an early evening time, and the show was cancelled after some six months on the air.

In the same year, 1960, Simeone organized another group, which he called The Harry Simeone Songsters, whose style he made similar to that of the Ray Conniff Singers. Under his direction, that group produced a baseball-oriented song called "It's a Beautiful Day for a Ball Game", which many major-league teams played at their ballparks or used to open their radio/TV broadcasts. The song is on one of the Baseball's Greatest Hits CDs.

In 1964, Simeone signed with Kapp Records. The following year he recorded a new version of "The Little Drummer Boy" for his album O' Bambino — The Little Drummer Boy.

Final years
On May 22, 2000, Simeone and his wife, by then living on the Upper East Side of New York City, officially established the Harry and Margaret Simeone Music Scholarship at Yale University by bestowing a gift of US$1 million. His wife Margaret died the following year, after which Harry's health declined. He died on February 22, 2005, at the age of 94, at Beth Israel Medical Center in Manhattan. Simeone's granddaughter Laura Stevenson also became a musician, becoming the frontwoman of Laura Stevenson and the Cans.

See also
List of arrangers

References

External links
[ Allmusic Biography]
School of Music awards first Simeone scholarship

1910 births
2005 deaths
20th-century American composers
20th-century American conductors (music)
20th-century American male musicians
American choral conductors
American male composers
American male conductors (music)
American music arrangers
Classical musicians from New Jersey
Classical musicians from New York (state)
Kapp Records artists
Mercury Records artists
Musicians from Newark, New Jersey